Engalukkum Kaalam Varum may refer to:
Engalukkum Kalam Varum (1967 film)
Engalukkum Kaalam Varum (2001 film)